Notyliopsis is a monotypic genus of flowering plants belonging to the family Orchidaceae. The only species is Notyliopsis beatricis.

Its native range is Colombia.

References

Oncidiinae
Oncidiinae genera
Monotypic orchid genera